Marcos Astina is an Argentine footballer who plays as a winger for Alvarado.

External links

References

1996 births
Living people
Association football midfielders
Argentine footballers
Argentine expatriate footballers
Argentina youth international footballers
Club Atlético Lanús footballers
Club Atlético Sarmiento footballers
Atlético San Luis footballers
Club Atlético Atlanta footballers
Club Atlético Alvarado players
Argentine Primera División players
Primera Nacional players
Ascenso MX players
Argentine expatriate sportspeople in Mexico
Expatriate footballers in Mexico